The Nagara, also written Nakara, are an indigenous Australian people of Arnhem Land in the Northern Territory.

Country
The Nagara owned roughly 200 sq.miles of tribal grounds around Boucaut Bay, and a stretch of territory southwest of the Blyth River. Their inland extension went as far as the
Tomkinson River and its mouth.

History
Faced with extinction the surviving members of the Gadjalivia melted into the Nagara in recent times, with the result that the latter took over the traditional lands associated with the former tribe.

Alternative names
 Naka:ra
 Nakara
 Ngara
 Na'kara
 Nakkara

Notes

Citations

Sources

Aboriginal peoples of the Northern Territory
Arnhem Land